Caroline Stoll (born November 4, 1960) is a retired American professional tennis player.

Career
Stoll won the 1976 Easter Bowl Girls' 16s Championships and the 1977 Easter Bowl Girls' 18s Championships as a junior. She turned professional in 1977 at the age of 16. She had career wins over Wendy Turnbull, Virginia Ruzici, Dianne Fromholtz, and Regina Maršíková. Stoll won five singles titles and reached a career-high ranking of world No. 15 in 1979. She retired in 1981.

WTA Tour finals

Singles: 7 (5–2)

Grand Slam singles tournament timeline

Note: The Australian Open was held twice in 1977, in January and December.

References

External links
 
 

1960 births
Living people
American female tennis players
People from Livingston, New Jersey
Sportspeople from Essex County, New Jersey
Tennis people from New Jersey
21st-century American women